Roberto Montorsi (born August 22, 1951) is an Italian former footballer who played professionally for Mantova, Juventus, Monza, Sorrento and Padova.

See also
Football in Italy
List of football clubs in Italy

References

1951 births
Living people
Italian footballers
Association football midfielders
Mantova 1911 players
Juventus F.C. players
A.C. Monza players
A.S.D. Sorrento players
Serie B players
Serie A players
Serie C players